Je te promets may refer to:

"Je te promets", song by Johnny Halladay from Gang (1986)
"Je te promets", song by Zaho from Dima (2008)